Central Ramindra (previously known as CentralPlaza Ramindra) is a shopping center on Ram Intra Road in the Bang Khen District of Bangkok, Thailand. It is the second shopping center of Central Pattana. The official number of the call center is (+66)2 797 8000,. The working hours are from 11:00 AM to 09:00 PM. This department store has opened in 1993 with 5 floors including central department store such as Tops Supermarket, Powerbuy, Super Sports and B2S, and also other departments as a book store, IT department and many more.
As the willingness of Central Pattana (CPN) which they want this department store Central Ramindra to be a community mall for families and communities, so they focus on the event for families commonly such as drawing and painting competitions, Junior Cheer Leader, Mother's or Father's Day, Sales or Grand Sales are also one other interesting events, or even a Pets show, house and garden events. For those who love watching movies, there's a world class cinema in the name of SF Cinema with the HD image and sound. Not only the events, but also the discounts for those who are holding central credit Card and The 1 Card for their royalty customer. with the perfect location which has been in the front of the big road, to come here is very convenient as you can take public transportations and also the capacity of a thousand places for car parks leads  this community mall to be a place for  families the best.

Overview 
This shopping center has a five floors and is built as a community concept. It contains a Central Department Store, retail outlets, restaurants and a six-screen cinema. There is a variety of family-oriented activities.

Anchors 
 Central Department Store
 Tops
 SF Cinema 6 Cinemas
 Power Buy
 Supersports
 B2S
 Uniqlo
 Food Patio

Parking
The shopping center has a parking space for 1000 cars.

See also 
 List of shopping malls in Thailand

Notes

References

External links 
 Central Group website

Shopping malls in Bangkok
Central Pattana
Bang Khen district
Shopping malls established in 1993
1993 establishments in Thailand